TMA Pai International Convention Centre is a convention center owned by the Manipal Academy of Higher Education located in MG Road, Mangalore. It is among the largest convention centers in India with a seating capacity for more than 4000 guests with an area of 16730 square meters.

This convention center is named after T M A Pai, the founder of Kasturba Medical College and Manipal Academy of Higher Education.

Facilities 
 Conference halls
 Auditorium/ Function hall
 Exhibition hall

References

Convention centres in India
Buildings and structures in Mangalore